"Cuando calienta el sol" (meaning When the sun heats (or warms) up) is a popular Spanish language song originally composed as "Cuando calienta el sol en Masachapa", Masachapa being a coastal town in Nicaragua. The music was written by Rafael Gaston Perez, a Nicaraguan songwriter and bandleader. SADAIC (the Argentine Society of Music Authors and Composers) also credits the Argentine composer Carlos Albert Martinoli.

The song was published in 1961 and made famous by the Cuban Mexican vocal group Los Hermanos Rigual with the lyrics by Carlos Rigual and Mario Rigual from the band. It was a big hit in many European charts reaching number one in Italy staying at the top for four consecutive weeks.

The song has been interpreted by a great number of singers with notable recordings by Javier Solis, Alberto Vázquez, Connie Francis, Los Marcellos Ferial, Pablo Montero, Raffaella Carrà. Italian singer Ines Taddio covered the song on his album wth the Hungarian Danceband Club Együttes (Link to Discogs) in 1963. Mexican singer Luis Miguel covered the song on his album Soy Como Quiero Ser in 1987 which was produced by Juan Carlos Calderón. It was released as the third single from the album and peaked at number 50 on the Billboard Hot Latin Songs chart in the United States. The music video for Miguel's version was directed by Pedro Torres and filmed in Acapulco.

Character Bruno Cortona, played by Vittorio Gassman in the classic Il Sorpasso (1962) sings, in Spanish, the first verse of "Cuando Calienta el sol" in a beach scene.

Adaptations

Love Me with All Your Heart

The song was adapted into English with the English lyrics credited to Michael Vaughn (or Maurice Vaughn) and sometimes to Sunny Skylar. The English lyrics are not a translation of the original lyrics:  
A version recorded by The Ray Charles Singers went to number three on the Billboard Hot 100 and spent four weeks at number one on the Pop-Standard singles chart in June 1964. 
Karl Denver's version also charted at #37 in the UK in 1964.
The Bachelors version reached #38 on US Pop chart in 1966. 
Johnny Rodriguez version made it to #7 on the US country charts in 1978.
Other notable versions include those by Andy Russell (singer) Vikki Carr, The Lettermen, Bing Crosby, Petula Clark, Engelbert Humperdinck, Nancy Sinatra, Agnetha Fältskog.

Quand le soleil était là
The song was adapted into French language as "Quand le soleil était là" and was recorded by a great number of artists in French including Bob Azzam, Florence Passy and Rosy Armen (all in 1962), Ginette Ravel (1963), Gloria Lasso.

Other languages
There are great number of language interpretations including Lola Novakovic as "Zalazak sunca" (in Serbo-Croat).Also Croat singers 'Trio Tividi' and 'Gabi Novak' as  "Kad zalazi sunce". There is also a version in Portuguese sung by Marco Paulo titled "Sempre que Brilha o Sol".

See also
List of number-one hits of 1962 (Italy)

References

Spanish-language songs
1961 songs
1988 singles
Luis Miguel songs
Song recordings produced by Juan Carlos Calderón
Number-one singles in Italy